Exhibition Centre Liverpool is a multi-million pound exhibition centre, the latest addition to Liverpool event campus, alongside interconnected sister venues ACC Liverpool and M&S Bank Arena.

History

The 8,100m2 exhibition centre was constructed from January 2014 and opened in September 2015. A sky bridge connecting the building to the adjacent convention centre was completed in September 2015, in turn creating the only purpose built interconnected arena, convention centre and exhibition facility in the UK. During its first year of opening, the Exhibition Centre welcomed more than 113,00 visitors over 100 different exhibitions.

The venue can also be utilised for standing concerts for up to 7,000, with the introduction of Space by M&S Bank Arena Liverpool, Exhibition Centre Liverpool's sister venue.

See also
 ACC Liverpool

References

External links

Exhibition Centre
2015 establishments in England
Liverpool Exhibition Centre
Exhibition Centre